Julian Spalding (born 15 June 1947 in Lewisham, South London) is an English art critic, writer, broadcaster and a former curator. Considered to be a controversial maverick and outspoken critic of the art world, he has frequently contributed to arts, news and current affairs programmes on radio and TV.

Spalding grew up on a council estate in St Mary Cray, South London. His upbringing there played an important part in shaping his subsequent outlook, particularly with regard to understanding how social inequality and cultural deprivation have a negative impact on people's lives.

He studied art history at the University of Nottingham and art at Nottingham Art College, and after a brief spell as an artist and designer he chose to work in museums and galleries. Spalding started as an art assistant at museums in Leicester and Durham before becoming director of galleries for Sheffield, and then Manchester.  In 1989 he was appointed director of Glasgow Museums, responsible for the largest collection managed by a local authority and Kelvingrove Art Gallery and Museum.

During his career as a curator he established several award-winning, innovative galleries and museum services, including the Ruskin Gallery in Sheffield; the St Mungo Museum of Religious Life and Art and The Gallery of Modern Art (GoMA) in Glasgow; and the Open Museum. In 2000, he also instigated the now international Campaign for Drawing.

In 1999, he was awarded the Lord Provost's Prize for Services to the Visual Arts in Glasgow for his directorship of Glasgow Art Galleries and Museums, although his curatorial career was cut short the same year when his post, along with others, was abolished by Glasgow City Council. Spalding subsequently spoke internationally and advised museums and galleries about new and innovative approaches, later outlined as what he describes as a practical philosophy in his 2002 book The Poetic Museum. He is also a Companion of the Guild of St George, and served as Master from 1996 to 2005.

Since 2001, he has concentrated chiefly on his writing, winning the Banister Fletcher Prize in 2006 for his book The Art of Wonder.

Bibliography
  "Realisation - from Seeing to Understanding - the Origin of Art' (2015)
  "Summers of Discontent - the purpose of the arts today" by Raymond Tallis, with Julian Spalding (2014)
  Con Art: Why you ought to sell your Damien Hirsts while you can, [Amazon/Kindle] (2012)
  Nothing On, [Amazon/Kindle] (2012)
 The Best Art You've Never Seen: 101 Hidden Treasures from around the World, Rough Guides (2010) 
 The Art of Wonder : A History of Seeing, Prestel (2005) 
 Contemplating the Reflection of the Moon in a Pool : Musing on museums of the future, Netherlands Museums Association, Amsterdam (2004)
 The Eclipse of Art: Tackling the Crisis in Art Today Prestel (2003) 
 The Poetic Museum: Reviving Historic Collections, Prestel (2002) 
 Gallery of Modern Art Glasgow: The First Years, Scala Books (1996) 
 Happy Days, Beryl Cook (Introduction), Victor Gollancz (1995) 
 Is There Life in Museums?, W H Smith Contemporary Papers (1990)
 Lowry: The Paintings and Drawings, The Herbert Press in association with the South Bank Board (1987)
 The Art of Watercolour Painting, Manchester City Art Galleries (1987)
 Modern Art in the Collections of Manchester City Art Galleries, Manchester City Art Galleries (1986)
 Three Little Books on Painting: 1. Light, Arts Council of Great Britain (1984) 
 Three Little Books on Painting: 2. Movement, Arts Council of Great Britain (1984) 
 Three Little Books on Painting: 3. Image, Arts Council of Great Britain (1984) 
 George Fullard, Arts Council of Great Britain (1984)
 The Forgotten Fifties, Sheffield City Art Galleries (1984) 
 Francis Davison, Arts Council of Great (1983) 
 Fragments Against Ruin: a Journey through Modern Art, Arts Council of Great Britain (1981) 
 Lowry, Phaidon Press (1979)

References 
People of Today: Julian Spalding, Esq., Debrett's Official Biography
Art in an Ephemeral Age: Julian Spalding Profile Intelligence² Debate, 14 November 2009
Artworld Maverick, Louis Torres, Aritos: Online Review of the Arts, November 2007
The Poetic Museum: reviving historic collections by Julian Spalding, Robert Hewison, The Independent, Wednesday, 3 April 2002

References

External links

Julian Spalding Website
Campaign For Drawing
Open Museum
Intelligence² Art in an Ephemeral Age Debate
BBC News—Julian Spalding attacks Damien Hirst 'con art'

Articles by Spalding
"Obituary: Nerys Johnson", The Guardian, Wednesday 4, July 2001
"More central control is the last thing our museums need", The Independent, Wednesday, 24 October 2001
"The death of the National Gallery" New Statesman, 8 April 2002
"A broad brush. Beauty and skill are no longer relevant to the aesthetic debate" New Statesman, 29 September 2003
"Taking a Fresh look at art", The Guardian, Thursday, 9 November 2006

1947 births
Living people
English art critics
English curators
People educated at Chislehurst and Sidcup Grammar School
Guild of St George